Volcanic glass is the amorphous (uncrystallized) product of rapidly cooling magma. Like all types of glass, it is a state of matter intermediate between the closely packed, highly ordered array of a crystal and the highly disordered array of liquid. Volcanic glass may refer to the interstitial material, or matrix, in an aphanitic (fine-grained) volcanic rock, or to any of several types of vitreous igneous rocks.

Origin
Volcanic glass is formed when magma is rapidly cooled. Magma rapidly cooled to below its normal crystallization temperature becomes a supercooled liquid, and, with further rapid cooling, this becomes an amorphous solid. The change from supercooled liquid to glass occurs at a temperature called the glass transition temperature, which depends on both cooling rate and the amount of water dissolved in the magma. Magma rich in silica and poor in dissolved water is most easily cooled rapidly enough to form volcanic glass. As a result, rhyolite magmas, which are high in silica, can produced tephra composed entirely of volcanic glass and may also form glassy lava flows. Ash-flow tuffs typically consist of countless microscopic shards of volcanic glass. Basalt, which is low in silica, forms glass only with difficulty, so that basalt tephra almost always contains at least some crystalline material (quench crystals).

The mechanisms controlling formation of volcanic glass are further illustrated by the two forms of basaltic glass, tachylite and sideromelane. Tachylite is opaque to transmitted light because of the abundance of tiny oxide mineral crystals suspended in the glass. Sideromelane is partially transparent because it contains much fewer crystals. Sideromelane is abundant only in eruptions where basalt magma has been very rapidly cooled by contact with water, such as phreatomagmatic eruptions. Basaltic volcanic glass is also present in pillow lavas.

Of the cooling mechanisms responsible for forming volcanic glass, the most effective is quenching by water, followed by cooling by entrained air in an eruption column. The least effective mechanism is cooling at the bottom of a flow in contact with the ground.

Types
Most commonly, volcanic glass refers to obsidian, a rhyolitic glass with high silica (SiO2) content.

Other types of volcanic glass include the following:

 Pumice, which is considered a glass because it has no crystal structure.
 Apache tears, a kind of nodular obsidian.
 Tachylite (also spelled tachylyte), a basaltic glass with relatively low silica content.
 Sideromelane, a less common form of tachylyte.
 Palagonite, an alteration product of basaltic glass.
 Hyaloclastite, a hydrated tuff-like breccia of sideromelane and palagonite.
 Pele's hair, threads or fibers of volcanic glass, usually basaltic.
 Pele's tears, tear-like drops of volcanic glass, usually basaltic.
 Limu o Pele (Pele's seaweed), thin sheets and flakes of brownish-green to near-clear volcanic glass, usually basaltic.

Alteration
Volcanic glass is chemically unstable and readily decomposes. Water molecules readily react with the open, disordered structure of volcanic glass, removing soluble cations from the glass and precipitating secondary (authigenic) minerals. As a result, lithification of volcanic ash is one of the fastest low-temperature lithification processes. Alteration of volcanic glass at mid-ocean ridges may have contributed significantly to the formation of massive sulfide deposits, and alteration of volcanic ash beds formed economically important zeolite and bentonite deposits.

References

Volcanology
Glass in nature
Volcanic rocks